Transana is a software package used to analyze digital video or audio data. Transana used to be a GPL licensed software, but has become proprietary software in recent releases.

Features
Transana lets the user analyze and manage your data, transcribe it, identify analytically interesting clips, assign keywords to clips, arrange and rearrange clips, create complex collections of interrelecris en français fdp ated clips, explore relationships between applied keywords, and share your analysis with colleagues. The goal is to find a new way to focus on the data, and manage large collections of video and audio files and clips.

History
Transana is a product of the Digital Insight Project, and it is being developed with funding from the National Science Foundation through the National Partnership for Computational Infrastructure at the San Diego Supercomputer Center and the TalkBank Project at Carnegie Mellon University.

See also
 Computer assisted qualitative data analysis software
 TalkBank

References

Notes
 Transana Review (Linguistic Annotation Wiki)
 "Choosing a CAQDAS Package" (Lewins & Silver 2006 working paper, pdf) (review of Transana 2, among others)
 "Transana 2.40: Distinguishing features and functions" (Lewins & Silver December 2009, pdf)
 Dempster, P. & Woods, D. (2011). The Economic Crisis Through the Eyes of Transana.  Forum Qualitative Sozialforschung / Forum: Qualitative Social Research, 12, 1
 Woods, D. & Dempster, P. (2011). Tales from the Bleeding Edge: The Qualitative Analysis of Complex Video Data Using Transana.  Forum Qualitative Sozialforschung / Forum: Qualitative Social Research, 12, 1

External links
 
 GitHub Code Repository of Transana
 

Free QDA software
Free software programmed in Python
Software that uses wxWidgets
Free multilingual software
Windows multimedia software
MacOS multimedia software
2001 software
Linguistic research software